The 1972 British Columbia general election for the Canadian province of British Columbia was held to elect members of the Legislative Assembly of British Columbia. The election was called on July 24, 1972, and held on August 30, 1972.  The new legislature met for the first time on October 17, 1972. David Barrett led the social democratic New Democratic Party to victory, winning a majority government.

The Social Credit Party, led by Premier W.A.C. Bennett, was defeated after governing British Columbia since the 1952 election. Social Credit's share of the popular vote fell by over 15 percentage points, and the party lost 28 of the seats it had won in the previous election.

The Liberal Party held onto its five seats, while the Progressive Conservative Party, under the leadership of Derrill Warren, returned to the legislature for the first time since the 1953 election by winning two seats.

In four ridings and part of a fifth, a referendum was held on the question of daylight saving time and which time zone to use concurrently with the election.

Social Credit ran a lackluster campaign beset by gaffes. A week before the general election, cabinet minister Phil Gaglardi remarked to a newspaper that Bennett would resign after the election, calling him "an old man who doesn't understand what is happening with the young people of this province". The remark proved damaging, bringing the issue of whether Bennett and his party were worn out after 20 years in office to the forefront of the campaign. A pre-campaign visit by Bennett and his cabinet to New Westminster turned violent after they were confronted by demonstrators, who injured eight ministers, a melee for which Bennett tried to blame Barrett. Shortly after the Social Credit campaign started, Bennett was tricked into shaking hands with current Progressive Conservative leader Derril Warren in front of a photographer from The Province. After the photograph, depicting a smiling Warren and scowling Bennett, was published on The Province's front page, Bennett spent the rest of the campaign antagonising the media, refusing to tell reporters where he was appearing.

Barrett benefited from his youth, allowing the media to contrast him with the aged Bennett, and ran a campaign focused on "people issues" such as urban transit, public auto insurance, and increased royalties from the province's timber and minerals industries. Late in the campaign, Bennett declared at a Social Credit rally, "The socialist hordes are at the gates of British Columbia!"

Although Bennett's campaign had been lacklustre, no commentators anticipated the party's loss. The resulting NDP majority came as a surprise. Historian David J. Mitchell wrote, "The surprise was not just [the Social Credit] defeat, but its magnitude." In his victory speech, Barrett told supporters that ten thousand people had worked for 40 years to get the NDP and its predecessor, the Co-operative Commonwealth Federation, elected into office, and vowed, "I will not let their hopes or aspirations down."

Results

See also
List of British Columbia political parties

Notes

References

1972
1972 elections in Canada
1972 in British Columbia
August 1972 events in Canada